Color Developing Agent 2 is the second in the series of color developing agents used in developing color films.  It is commonly known as CD-2 and is chemically known as 4-diethylamino-o-toluidine, 1,4-benzenediamine, N4,N4-diethyl-2-methyl-, N1,N1-diethyl-3-methylbenzene-1,4-diamine, or 4-(diethylamino)-2-methylaniline.  In color development, after reducing a silver atom in a silver halide crystal, the oxidized developing agent combines with a color coupler to form a color dye molecule.

See Also
 Color Developing Agent 1
 Color Developing Agent 3
 Color Developing Agent 4

References

Photographic chemicals
Anilines